Gary Birch may refer to:
 Gary Birch (footballer), English footballer and manager
 Gary Birch (electrical engineer), Canadian Paralympian and electrical engineer